PP, pp or Pp may refer to:

Arts and entertainment
 Pianissimo, a music term meaning very quiet, from musical dynamics
 Production code for the 1967–1968 Doctor Who serial The Enemy of the World
Police Procedural - a subgenre of procedural drama and detective fiction

Businesses and organisations

Political parties 
 Patriotic Party (Guatemala)
 People's Party (Spain) (Partido Popular)
 Pirate Party (Global)
 Progressistas (Brazil) (Progressistas)
 Progressive Party (Iceland)
 People's Partnership (Trinidad and Tobago)
 We Continue the Change (Bulgaria) ("Prodalzhavame promyanata")

Other businesses and organizations
 Pancasila Youth (Pemuda Pancasila), an Indonesian paramilitary organization
 PediaPress, a German software company
 Planned Parenthood, a reproductive health organization
 Philipp Plein, logo
 PayPal, an online payments company

Religion 
 pp, Papa Pontifex, post-nominal used by popes

Science, technology, and mathematics

Biology and medicine
 Vitamin PP or nicotinamide
 Paliperidone palmitate, an antipsychotic medication
 Pancreatic polypeptide, a polypeptide secreted by PP cells
 PP cell or pancreatic polypeptide cell
 pro parte, abbreviated p.p., for a type of synonymy in taxonomy

Computing 
 PP (complexity), a probabilistic polynomial time complexity class
 PP-format (Post Processing Format), a file format for meteorological data
 PP X.400, an e-mail protocol
 Plug and play (P&P), a property of a peripheral device
 Microsoft PowerPoint, a presentation program

Mathematics
 P–P plot, a probability plot, in statistics
 Percentage point, in business writing and statistics
 Process performance index (Pp)
 Presque partout (almost everywhere), in measure theory and analysis.  (This is always lower case -- 'pp'.  In English 'ae' is often used instead.)

Other uses in science and technology
 Paris Principles (cataloging), a theoretical foundation for the creation of bibliographical cataloging rules for libraries
 Walther PP, a pistol
 Length between perpendiculars ("pp" or "p/p"), the length of a ship
 Peak to peak (p–p) amplitude of a signal
 Polypropylene, a common plastic polymer
 Proton–proton chain reaction, in nuclear physics

Other uses 
 p.p., Per procurationem, when signing on behalf of another
 pp, pages (of a book), an example of the convention of doubling the letters in the acronym to indicate plural words, see Acronym and initialism#Representing plurals and possessives
 Percy Pig, a British brand of pig-shaped fruit-flavoured confectionery products
 Pierre Poilievre, Conservative politician in Canada.
 PinkPantheress, singer

See also 
 Peepee (disambiguation)